Oswald Burton (21 August 1874 – 4 July 1944) was an English cricketer who played first-class cricket for Derbyshire in 1901 and 1905.

Burton was born at Gorton, Manchester. He made his debut for Derbyshire in a match against Marylebone Cricket Club (MCC) in the 1901 season. He was not out for 9 in both innings and took 2 wickets. He next appeared in the 1905 season against Lancashire when he again took 2 wickets but did not bat in either innings. Against Nottinghamshire he was not out in both innings and took one wicket.

Burton was a right-arm medium-fast bowler and in three first-class matches took five wickets at an average of 31.20 with a best performance of 2 for 44. He was a right-hand batsman and played four innings in three first-class matches without being out in any of them and with a top score of 9 not out.

Burton died at Kingsdown, Bristol at the age of 69.

References

1874 births
1944 deaths
Derbyshire cricketers
English cricketers
People from Gorton